Martín Antonio Gómez Rodríguez (born 23 January 1989) is a Panamanian football player who is currently playing for the Liga Panameña de Fútbol side San Francisco.

Club career
Gómez played for Atlético Chiriquí before moving to San Francisco in 2011.

International career
He made his debut for the Panama on March 13, 2009, against Trinidad & Tobago.

His final international was an August 2011 friendly match against Bolivia, although he was named as an emergency replacement for Ismael Díaz at the 2016 Copa América Centenario.

International goals
Scores and results list Panama's goal tally first.

References

External links

 Profile - San Francisco 

1989 births
Living people
People from Chiriquí Province
Association football defenders
Panamanian footballers
Panama international footballers
Atlético Chiriquí players
San Francisco F.C. players